Halifax County is a county located in the Commonwealth of Virginia. As of the 2020 census, the population was 34,022. Its county seat is Halifax.

History 

Occupied by varying cultures of indigenous peoples for thousands of years, in historic times English colonists encountered Siouan language Native Americans. Halifax County was established in 1752 by English colonists from Lunenburg County. The county was named for George Montagu-Dunk, 2nd Earl of Halifax.

Through the 1990 Census, South Boston was an independent city, but it became a town again and rejoined Halifax County in 1995.

Geography

Adjacent counties
 Campbell County - northwest
 Charlotte County - northeast
 Mecklenburg County - east
 Granville County, North Carolina - southeast
 Person County, North Carolina - south
 Caswell County, North Carolina - southwest
 Pittsylvania County - west

Major highways

Demographics

2020 census

Note: the US Census treats Hispanic/Latino as an ethnic category. This table excludes Latinos from the racial categories and assigns them to a separate category. Hispanics/Latinos can be of any race.

2000 Census
As of the census of 2000, there were 37,355 people, 15,018 households, and 10,512 families residing in the county. The population density was 46 people per square mile (18/km2). There were 16,953 housing units at an average density of 21 per square mile (8/km2). The racial makeup of the county was 60.32% White, 38.02% Black or African American, 0.20% Native American, 0.24% Asian, 0.01% Pacific Islander, 0.44% from other races, and 0.77% from two or more races. 1.23% of the population were Hispanic or Latino of any race.

There were 15,018 households, out of which 28.60% had children under the age of 18 living with them, 51.20% were married couples living together, 14.80% had a female householder with no husband present, and 30.00% were non-families. 27.40% of all households were made up of individuals, and 13.10% had someone living alone who was 65 years of age or older. The average household size was 2.43 and the average family size was 2.94.

In the county, the population was spread out, with 23.40% under the age of 18, 6.90% from 18 to 24, 26.40% from 25 to 44, 26.30% from 45 to 64, and 17.10% who were 65 years of age or older. The median age was 41 years. For every 100 females there were 90.80 males. For every 100 females age 18 and over, there were 86.70 males.

The median income for a household in the county was $29,929, and the median income for a family was $37,845. Males had a median income of $27,498 versus $20,684 for females. The per capita income for the county was $16,353. About 11.50% of families and 15.70% of the population were below the poverty line, including 18.90% of those under age 18 and 19.60% of those age 65 or over.

Government

Board of Supervisors
 District 1: Ricky Short 
 District 2: Larry D Roller
 District 3: Hubert Pannell
 District 4: Ronnie E Duffey
 District 5: Dean E Throckmorton
 District 6: Stanley Brandon
 District 7: Garland B Ricketts
 District 8: William Bryant Claiborne
 Tie Breaker: Wayne Smith

Constitutional officers
 Clerk of the Circuit Court: Cathy M. Cosby (I)
 Commissioner of the Revenue: Brenda P. Powell (I)
 Commonwealth's Attorney: Tracy Quackenbush Martin (I)
 Sheriff: Fred S. Clark (I)
 Treasurer: Ruth Ann Oakes (I)

Halifax is represented by Republicans Frank Ruff and Bill Stanley in the Virginia Senate, Republican James E. Edmunds in the Virginia House of Delegates, and Republican Bob Good in the U.S. House of Representatives.
Democratic Mark Warner and Tim Kaine United States Senator from Virginia.

Communities

Towns
 Halifax
 Scottsburg
 South Boston
 Virgilina

Census-designated places
 Clover
 Cluster Springs
 Mountain Road
 Nathalie
 Riverdale

Other unincorporated communities
 Alton
 Cody
 Turbeville
 Vernon Hill

See also
 National Register of Historic Places listings in Halifax County, Virginia

References

External links
 Official site of Halifax County & South Boston, Virginia
 History of Halifax County and South Boston, Virginia
 Official site of Town of South Boston - largest town within the County
 Official site of the County Museum
 Halifax County South Boston Public Library System

 
Virginia counties
1752 establishments in Virginia